Isorineloricaria is a genus of catfish in the family Loricariidae from northwestern South America. They live in rivers and streams, typically with slow to moderately running water, in the Orinoco, Maracaibo, Magdalena and Guayas basins (one species in each basin).

Taxonomy
The taxonomy of this genus has been a matter of dispute, all having been placed in Hypostomus in the past, and some occasionally placed in Squaliforma. Squaliforma is now regarded as a synonym of Aphanotorulus, but species west of the Andes have been moved to Isorineloricaria.

There are currently 4 recognized species in this genus:

 Isorineloricaria acuarius C. K. Ray & Armbruster, 2016 
 Isorineloricaria spinosissima  (Steindachner, 1880) (Zucchini catfish) 
 Isorineloricaria tenuicauda  (Steindachner, 1878)
 Isorineloricaria villarsi (Lütken, 1874)

References

Hypostominae
Fish of South America
Fish of Ecuador
Catfish genera
Taxa named by Isaäc J. H. Isbrücker
Freshwater fish genera